Protopithecus is an extinct genus of large New World monkey that lived during the Pleistocene. Fossils have been found in the Toca da Boa Vista cave of Brazil, as well as other locales in the country. Fossils of another large, but less robust ateline monkey, Caipora, were also discovered in Toca da Boa Vista.

History 
Fossils of primates from the New World were unknown for many years despite the large quantities of megafauna fossils that had been found by Europeans since the 1700s. In July 1836, a left proximal femur (UZM 1623) and a right distal humerus (UZM 3530) were collected by Danish paleontologist Peter Wilhelm Lund, who is commonly hailed as the founder of Brazilian paleontology, from the limestone cave of Lapo de Periperi. Lapo de Periperi is part of the cave networks of Lagoa Santa, Brazil that bear many fossils dating to the Late Pleistocene - Early Holocene. The humerus and femur were both found in the same cavern but not the exact same site, however they still are from the same individual. These two fragmentary fossils were originally described by Lund in a letter dated to November 16, 1837, but it was not formally described until it was published in a Danish journal in 1838. It was dubbed Protopithecus brasiliensis, the first of four fossil primates that Lund would name based on Lagoa Santa fossils. Lund recognized that the taxon was a platyrrhine monkey, despite their large size. The description was then republished in several other European journals in 1839 and ‘40, even being mentioned in British naturalist Charles Darwin’s landmark publication On the Origin of Species. The original description of Protopithecus was brief, but a monograph by Herluf Winge in 1895 expanded it and allocated a cervical vertebra, caudal vertebra, proximal phalanx, middle phalanx, and a metatarsal. The assignment of these fossils is dubious, as they are from smaller individuals and different caverns. Winge also placed Protopithecus brasiliensis into the genus Eriodes (now Brachyteles) based on the belief that the fossils were indistinguishable from those of existing spider monkeys except for their size. Due to this, the fossils mostly faded into obscurity for over a century. Another species of Protopithecus, P. bonariensis, was erected for isolated incisors that had been collected from deposits further south in Buenos Aires, Argentina. The species was described by French paleontologist Paul Gervais and Argentine paleontologist Florentino Ameghino, but the fossils were not catalogued, illustrated, or described in detail making the species a nomen nudum. Doubts over whether the fossils even belonged to Protopithecus have also been raised, as the fossils come from Argentina and were likely lumped into the genus.

The story of Protopithecus was reopened in 1992 when two nearly complete skeletons of gigantic platyrrhines were discovered in Toca da Boa Vista caves in the adjacent state of Bahia, also dating to the Late Pleistocene. The fossils were much more complete than those found by Lund and included several important elements like the skull, mandible, and teeth. These too were identified as Brachyteles and similar to B. (Protopithecus) brasiliensis in a brief announcement of the discovery by paleontologist Castor Cartelle in 1993. One of the two skeletons was from a subadult individual of a new genus and species, Caipora bambuiorum, in 1996 as a giant spider monkey. The other skeleton was identified as a specimen of Protopithecus brasiliensis, which was made valid once again as a genus based on size and long bone morphology. It was made into a hypodigm of the species in 1995, but only on the basis of size and long bone morphology. The Toca da Boa Vista skeleton was used as the basis for future studies of the species’ paleobiology, anatomy, and more instead of the holotype due to its more complete nature. However, a 2013 study of the Toca da Boa Vista found that it had distinct humeral and femoral morphology from the holotype and was from its own genus and species, named Cartelles coimbrafilhoi. This led to most of the material assigned to Protopithecus to be moved to Cartelles except for the holotype. Since then, Protopithecus has received little attention.

Description and paleobiology 

With slightly longer arms than legs, Protopithecus resembled spider monkeys, but its limb bones were nearly twice as thick. Its head was more similar to a howler monkey's, which has a lower jaw that juts forward to accommodate an apple-size vocal sac. As such, Protopithecus may have been able to howl just like them.

Although its large size has led to the suggestion that it may have been partially or primarily terrestrial, Halenar (2011) found no adaptations to terrestrial locomotion in the skeleton of Protopithecus, which has a morphology characteristic of arboreal monkeys, although given its estimated weight, it is unlikely to have been a suspensory feeder like Ateles and Brachyteles. It may have been an arboreal quadruped which made occasional use of the ground, comparable to a great ape or the larger subfossil lemurs.

Although closely related, howler and spider monkeys split from their common ancestor long before Protopithecus evolved. This means that the distinctive features of these modern monkeys have evolved more than once.

Paleoecology
Other animals found in Toca da Boa Vista include another large atelid, Caipora bambuiorum, as well as Arctotherium wingei, Catonyx cuvieri, Desmodus draculae, Nothrotherium maquinense, Protocyon troglodytes, Smilodon populator, giant anteaters, collared peccaries, crab-eating foxes and raccoons, striped hog-nosed skunks, and guanacoes.

The environment inhabited by Protopithecus is unclear. Most of Brazil was thought to have been covered in open tropical cerrado vegetation during the Late Pleistocene, but if Protopithecus and Caipora were arboreal, their presence suggests that the region may have supported a dense closed forest during the Late Pleistocene. It is possible that the region alternated between dry open savannah and closed wet forest throughout the climate change of the Late Pleistocene.

References 

†Protopithecus
Prehistoric primate genera
Pleistocene primates
Pleistocene mammals of South America
Ensenadan
Lujanian
Pleistocene Brazil
Fossils of Brazil
Fossil taxa described in 1838